The Shulbinsk Hydro Power Plant (Шульбинская ГЭС) is a hydro power plant on the middle reach of the Irtysh River, 70 km up the stream from Semipalatinsk in East Kazakhstan Region of Kazakhstan. It has 6 individual turbines, which will deliver up to 702 MW of power and generates 1.66 billion kilowatt-hours of electricity per year. It is owned and operated by AES Corporation.

See also

 List of power stations in Kazakhstan

References

Hydroelectric power stations in Kazakhstan
Dams on the Irtysh River
AES Corporation